This is a list of notable chess games sorted chronologically.

pre-1700 
 1475: Castellví–Vinyoles, Valencia 1475. The first documented chess game played with the modern queen and bishop moves; the moves were described in the poem Scachs d'amor.
 1623: Greco–NN, London 1623. Gioachino Greco mates on the eighth move with a queen sacrifice.

18th century 
 1788: Bowdler–Conway, London. Thomas Bowdler offers the first example of a famous double rook sacrifice.
 1790: Smith–Philidor, London. François-André Danican Philidor, who was quoted as saying "Pawns are the soul of chess", demonstrates the power of a superior pawn formation.

19th century 
 1834: La Bourdonnais–McDonnell, 50th Match Game, London. Reuben Fine in The World's Great Chess Games describes it as the first great immortal game of chess. McDonnell sacrifices his queen for two minor pieces.
 1834: La Bourdonnais–McDonnell, 62nd Match Game, London. Perhaps the most famous win of the match (considered an unofficial world championship), La Bourdonnais shows how a rolling pawn mass can overwhelm all of his opponent's major pieces. 
 1843: St. Amant–Staunton, 5th Match Game, Paris. Pierre Charles Fournier de Saint-Amant resigns in this unofficial world championship match game with Howard Staunton, in which Staunton remarked, "The latter portion of this game is conducted with remarkable skill by both parties."
 1844: Hoffmann–Petrov, Warsaw. Alexander Petrov wins with a queen sacrifice and a king hunt, in a game known as "Petrov's Immortal".
 1851: Anderssen–Kieseritzky, London. "The Immortal Game" Kieseritzky neglects his development and Adolf Anderssen sacrifices his queen and both rooks for a win.
 1852: Anderssen–Dufresne, Berlin. "The Evergreen Game" Anderssen mates with what Savielly Tartakower called "[a] combination second to none in the literature of the game."
 1857: Paulsen–Morphy, New York. Paul Morphy gains an advantage in development and transforms it into a powerful kingside attack with a queen sacrifice.
 1858: Morphy–Duke of Brunswick & Count Isouard, Paris. "The Opera Game" Morphy shows the virtue of quick development and wins by sacrificing much material, mating on the 17th move with his last two pieces.
 1862: Steinitz–Mongredien, London. Wilhelm Steinitz won the tournament's brilliancy prize for this game.
 1872: Hamppe–Meitner, Vienna. The "Immortal Draw" between Carl Hamppe and Philipp Meitner, involving a queen sacrifice.
 1874: Knorre–Chigorin, St. Petersburg. White's premature castling on the king side combined with an ineffective pin allows Mikhail Chigorin to strike back with a violent counterattack culminating in a brilliant queen sacrifice and subsequent checkmate.
 1883: Zukertort–Blackburne, London
 1889: Lasker–Bauer, Amsterdam. This game between Emanuel Lasker and Johann Hermann Bauer was the first famous example of the double bishop sacrifice.
 1895: Pillsbury–Tarrasch, Hastings. Pillsbury's kingside attack breaks through by a single tempo against Black's queenside play, against Tarrasch, then one of the strongest players of the world.
 1895: Steinitz–von Bardeleben, Hastings. This game is famous for its ten-move mating combination in the final position, which Steinitz demonstrated after the game. The peculiar circumstance of the conclusion of this game has been subject of scrutiny.
 1895: Pillsbury–Gunsberg, Hastings. In the final round of this prestigious tournament, Pillsbury secures overall victory by triumphing in an instructive endgame.
 1896: Pillsbury–Lasker, Saint Petersburg. Emanuel Lasker won the brilliancy prize for this game by exposing Pillsbury's king with the sacrifice of both rooks on the same square.

1900–1949 
 1904: Lasker–Napier, Cambridge Springs. Both players show great ingenuity. After a complicated web of tactics, Lasker simplifies into a winning endgame.
 1907: Rotlewi–Rubinstein, Lodz. Rubinstein wins this game with one of the most famous combinations ever played.
 1909: Rubinstein–Lasker, Saint Petersburg. Rubinstein's brilliant play culminates in 18.Qc1!! subsequently forcing Lasker to enter a rook endgame down a pawn which Rubinstein wins in masterly fashion.
 1912: Levitsky–Marshall, Breslau. Marshall's final move places his queen en prise in three different ways. The spectators are said to have showered the board with gold coins.
 1912: Edward Lasker–Thomas, London. With a queen sacrifice, Lasker exposes Black's king and with a series of checks drives it all the way to the other side of the board before checkmating with an advance of his king.
 1914: Lasker–Capablanca, St Petersburg. Lasker defeats Capablanca in a smooth positional game where his winning strategy seemed to flow right out of the opening to the end. Capablanca, himself renowned as a master of simple positions, was sufficiently rattled to lose in the next round as well, handing the tournament victory to Lasker.
 1918: Capablanca–Marshall, New York. In the main line Ruy Lopez, Marshall surprises Capablanca with a bold pawn sacrifice. Capablanca accepts the challenge fully aware of the fierce attack he is about to face.
 1920: Adams–Torre, New Orleans. Likely composed by Carlos Torre as a tribute to his benefactor E. Z. Adams, this game features the most famous back-rank mate combination in chess literature, involving six consecutive offers of the queen.
 1922: Alekhine–Bogoljubov, Pistyan. This game is referred in the famous novella The Royal Game by Stefan Zweig, which inspired multiple movies, theater plays and musical performances. In the fictional store, the position after 38. d6 is being reproduced in a game between the fictional world chess champion and a group of outmatched amateur players who are on the verge of promoting their c-pawn, when an unknown spectator frantically intervenes and explains how white will beat them in 9–10 moves after 38... c1Q 39. Bxc1 Nxc1 40. d7. He proposes 38... Kh7 instead, correctly predicting that 39. h4 will follow and after 39... Rc4 he maneuvers the game for 7–8 more moves until the world champion settles for a draw.
 1922: Bogoljubov–Alekhine, Hastings. Irving Chernev called this the greatest game of chess ever played, adding: "Alekhine's subtle strategy involves manoeuvres which encompass the entire chessboard as a battlefield. There are exciting plots and counterplots. There are fascinating combinations and brilliant sacrifices of Queens and Rooks. There are two remarkable promotions of Pawns and a third in the offing, before White decides to capitulate." (The Chess Companion, Chernev, Faber & Faber Ltd, 1970).
 1923: Sämisch–Nimzovich, Copenhagen "The Immortal Zugzwang Game".
 1924: Capablanca–Tartakower, New York. One of the most famous and instructive endgames ever played. Capablanca sacrifices two pawns with check to support his passed pawn.
 1924: Richard Réti–José Raúl Capablanca, New York. The game that ended Capablanca's eight-year run without a single loss in tournament play.
 1925: Réti–Alekhine, Baden-Baden. Alekhine initiates a stunning combination and foresees the final position resulting more than 15 moves later.
 1929: Glucksberg–Najdorf, Warsaw. In this game, dubbed the 'Polish Immortal', Black sacrifices all four minor pieces for victory.
 1934: Canal–Unknown, Budapest. "The Peruvian Immortal", sees Peruvian master Esteban Canal demolish his amateur opponent with the sacrifice of two rooks and queen.
 1935: Euwe–Alekhine, 26th Match Game, Zandvoort. This decisive game from the 1935 match for the world championship was dubbed 'The Pearl of Zandvoort' by Tartakower.
 1938: Botvinnik–Capablanca, Rotterdam. In this game from the AVRO 1938 tournament, Botvinnik obtains a strong initiative against Capablanca and brings the victory home with a long combination.
 1938: Parr–Wheatcroft, London. Irving Chernev and Fred Reinfeld described this as "one of the greatest combinative games on record!" (Fireside Book Of Chess, Simon & Schuster, 1949, pp. 392–93)
 1943: Molinari–Roux Cabral, Montevideo. This game from the 1943 Uruguayan Chess Championship, dubbed the "Uruguayan Immortal", sees Luis Roux Cabral sacrifice the exchange twice, followed by sacrifices of two minor pieces. After 33 moves, all three of his remaining pieces are en prise—and his opponent cannot stop checkmate.
 1946: Gusev–Auerbach, Chelyabinsk. Not to be confused with the late centenarian grandmaster and theorician Yuri Averbakh, this game, dubbed "Gusev's Immortal", was a game contested between the relatively obscure players Yuri Gusev and E Auerbach in an equally obscure minor tournament. It involved a sound positional queen sacrifice, which was blind to chess engines for 74 years, requiring Stockfish 11 six hours and 48 minutes at Depth 73/49 to recommend the queen sacrifice in 2020; Gusev went on to win. The game has been studied extensively online. National Master Sam Copeland ranked it the second-best game of the 1940s. Grandmaster Simon Williams called the queen sacrifice in Gusev's Immortal one of the most beautiful ideas that he had ever seen.

1950s 
 1953: Geller–Euwe, Zurich. Geller's attack seems to be sweeping Euwe off the board but the former World Champion has everything under control, uncorking an amazing sacrifice on move 22 to launch a counterattack that wins the game in only four more moves.
 1954: Botvinnik–Smyslov, 14th Match Game, Moscow. Smyslov sacrifices his queen for three minor pieces and coordinates them superbly to force Botvinnik's capitulation.
 1956: D. Byrne–Fischer, New York, "Game of the Century". Byrne makes a seemingly minor mistake on move 11, losing a tempo by moving the same piece twice. Fischer pounces, with accurate sacrificial play, culminating in a queen sacrifice. When the smoke has cleared, Fischer has a winning material advantage – a rook and two bishops for a queen, and coordinates them to force checkmate.
 1957: Sliwa–Bronstein, Gotha. "The Immortal losing game" between Bogdan Sliwa and David Bronstein. Black has a lost game but sets some elegant traps in attempting to snatch victory from the jaws of defeat.
 1958: Polugaevsky–Nezhmetdinov, Sochi. In one of the most celebrated games of all time, Nezhmetdinov sacrifices his queen on move 24, and goes on to win the game with a king hunt.
 1959: Tal–Smyslov, Bled. Tal initiates complications early in this game and obtains a strong attack. Smyslov defends well, but eventually stumbles with one erroneous move and Tal delivers the winning tactical blow.
 1959: Fischer–Petrosian, Zagreb. The only prominent game in which four queens were on board for seven moves. Match ends with draw by agreement.

1960s 
 1960: Spassky–Bronstein, Leningrad, "The Blue Bird Game". Spassky plays the King's Gambit and wins with a sacrificial attack.
 1960: Tal-Botvinnik, 1st Match Game, Moscow. Tal's critics said his daring, complicated style couldn't possibly work against the ironclad logic of the Father of Soviet Chess, but it did and Tal became the youngest World Champion ever.
 1962: Gufeld-Kavalek, Marianske Lazne. Kavalek sacrifices a piece, then one exchange, then the other exchange to push his avalanche of pawns down the board. By the end of the game he has lost all seven of his pieces but kept all eight of his pawns, which roll over White's remaining rook.
 1963: R. Byrne–Fischer, New York. Fischer executes a deep sacrificial attack to win in this miniature. Many of the players in the press room thought Fischer's position was hopeless and were surprised when they heard Byrne had resigned.
 1966: Petrosian-Spassky, 10th Match Game, Moscow. Petrosian, the master of the exchange sacrifice, does it twice in one game with the World Championship on the line.
 1968: Poole versus HAL 9000. A fictional game from the movie 2001: A Space Odyssey, based on a tournament game between A. Roesch and W. Schlage, Hamburg 1910. Astronaut Dr. Frank Poole plays against the supercomputer HAL 9000. The computer executes a strong sacrificial attack and wins in 15 moves.
 1969: Spassky-Petrosian, 19th Match Game, Moscow. Having fought his way to a World Championship rematch with Petrosian, Spassky makes the most of the opportunity, crashing through to take a decisive lead in the match.

1970s 
 1970: Larsen–Spassky, Belgrade. Spassky finds immediate punishment for Larsen's opening experiments, sacrificing a knight and a rook to create a passed pawn, winning the game in just 17 moves.
 1971: Harper-Zuk, Burnaby. The famous "Tomb Game" sees Black exploit two pins to drive his opponent's pieces into a corner and toward a position where White's only legal move will help Black to checkmate him.
 1972: Fischer–Spassky, 6th Match Game, Reykjavik. Game 6 of the highly publicized World Championship Match. Fischer launches an opening surprise by opening with 1.c4 instead of his favorite 1.e4. Spassky joined the audience in applauding Fischer's win and called it the best game of the World Chess Championship 1972.
 1972: Spassky–Fischer, 11th Match Game, Reykjavik. In Game 11 of the highly publicized World Championship Match Spassky completely destroys Fischer's Najdorf, giving Fischer his only loss in the poisoned pawn variation.
 1972: Spassky–Fischer, 13th Match Game, Reykjavik. Game 13 of the highly publicized World Championship Match. Fischer comes out on top in this complex, double-edged battle.
 1973: Bronstein–Ljubojevic, Petropolis Interzonal. Bronstein, who played a match for the World Championship before his grandmaster opponent could walk, turns back the clock, sacrifices both rooks and wins through sheer sorcery.
 1974: Karpov–Spassky, 9th Match Game, Leningrad. On Karpov's inexorable march to the World Championship, even a former World Champion can't cope with his subtle, seemingly effortless positional mastery.
 1978: Liu Wenzhe–Donner, Buenos Aires. "The Chinese Immortal"; at China's first olympiad, the little known Liu Wenzhe defeats the experienced Dutch grandmaster in 20 moves with a spectacular king's side attack.

1980s 
 1981: Kasparov–Gavrikov, USSR Championship, Frunze. One of Kasparov's dynamic, attacking wins from his first Soviet Championship victory at age 18 that heralded the arrival of a new contender for the World Chess Championship.
 1984: Portisch–Pinter, Hungarian Championship, Budapest. Pinter plays the game of his life against his famous opponent, sacrificing a piece in a queenless middlegame to pull Portisch's king into a deadly crossfire.
 1985: Karpov–Kasparov, 16th Match Game, Moscow. Kasparov employs a daring gambit and obtains a dominating position for his knight, stifling Karpov's forces and finishing off with a mating attack.
 1986: Kasparov–Karpov, 16th Match Game, Leningrad. The most spectacular game of their third World Championship match hangs in the balance until Kasparov's diabolical 37th move blows Karpov's defence away.
 1987: Kasparov–Karpov, 24th Match Game, Seville. Trailing by a point before the final game of their fourth World Championship match, Kasparov surprises Karpov by beginning quietly in Karpov's own style. With Karpov running low on time, Kasparov ratchets up the tension by sacrificing a pawn for an attack. Karpov fails to find the best defence and is finally forced to resign, leaving Kasparov the champion for another three years.
 1989: Piket–Kasparov, Tilburg. A typically devastating performance from Kasparov, whose dominance of super-tournaments in 1989 pushed his rating up to 2800, the first to reach that milestone.

1990s 
 1991: Ivanchuk–Yusupov, Brussels, 9th Match Game. Yusupov sacrifices his knight in his quest for the attack and breaks through after Ivanchuk's inaccuracies. In 1996, a jury of grandmasters and readers, voting in the Chess Informant, chose this game as the best game played in the years 1966–96.
 1992: Tal–Lautier, Barcelona. In his final tournament before his death at age 55, the Magician from Riga produces one last masterpiece against a Grandmaster from the next generation.
 1992: Ivanchuk–Anand, Linares, 1st Match Game. Anand breaks all principles of positional chess by getting doubled pawns, trading his good bishop only to reveal the deep idea later in the game, managing to create 2 passed pawns and eventually winning the game .
 1993: Short-Kasparov, PCA World Championship, London, 8th Match Game. Although the match was one-sided, the games were hard fought. In this game Short exposes Kasparov's king with a shower of sacrifices but can't land the knockout blow.
 1995: Cifuentes–Zvjaginsev, Wijk aan Zee. Black wins with a series of sacrifices that force White's king up to the 6th rank. Known as "The Pearl of Wijk aan Zee".
 1995: Topalov–Kramnik, Belgrade. Foreshadowing their bitter rivalry a decade later, two future World Champions refuse to draw and throw everything at each other until only one is left standing.
 1996: Deep Blue versus Kasparov, 1996, Game 1, the first game in which a chess-playing computer defeated a reigning world champion using classical time controls.
 1997: Deep Blue versus Kasparov, 1997, Game 6, the last game of the 1997 rematch. Deep Blue won, making it the first computer to defeat a world champion in a match.
 1999: Kasparov–Topalov, Wijk aan Zee 1999. "Kasparov's Immortal" features a rook sacrifice with a sacrificial combination lasting over 15 moves. One of the most commented chess games ever, with extensive press coverage.

 1999: Kasparov versus the World, in which Garry Kasparov, the reigning world champion, faced a group of players in consultation, who decided moves by vote. This group included 50,000 individuals from more than 75 countries. Kasparov won.

2000s 
 2000: Kasparov–Kramnik, Classical World Chess Championship 2000, 3rd Match Game, London. Kramnik revives the Berlin Defense to the Ruy Lopez (which had fallen out of favor), in which the queens are exchanged on move 8. The queenless endgame is difficult for Kramnik to defend but limits Kasparov's options, and the game ends in draw by agreement.
 2004: Kramnik–Leko, Classical World Chess Championship 2004, 14th Match Game, Brissago. Needing only a draw to win the World Championship, Leko plays too passively and pays the price.
 2005: Anand–Topalov, Sofia. Amazing in its complexity, this game finally ended in a hard-fought draw and was called "23rd-century chess" by Kramnik.
 2006: Karjakin–Anand, Corus chess tournament, Round 1, Wijk aan zee. Anand played a brilliant combination beginning with the sacrifice of a knight followed by sacrifice of a bishop and finally a rook mating with just a rook and a queen.
 2006: Kramnik–Topalov, World Chess Championship 2006, 16th Match Game, Elista. After 13 years of a divided World Chess Championship, the reunification match comes down to a final tiebreak game.

2010s 
2013: Aronian–Anand, Wijk aan Zee. In this game reigning world champion Viswanathan Anand exhibits a combination with a rook sacrifice and two more offered sacrifices to beat Levon Aronian, then ranked No. 3 in the world. ChessBase wrote that "[it] might surely go down as the game of the year", and The New York Times described it as "a game for the ages".
2013: Anand–Carlsen, World Championship 2013, 9th Match Game, Chennai. Two games down with only three to go in the match, Anand develops a dangerous kingside attack only to make a heartbreaking blunder on move 28. One game later, Magnus Carlsen becomes the 16th undisputed World Chess Champion.
2015: Wei Yi–Bruzon, Danzhou. In this game, chess prodigy Wei Yi plays a rook sacrifice that forces Black to take a king walk. Several quiet moves eventually force Black to throw in the towel. This game has been compared to Kasparov's Immortal and the Game of the Century, and described as the "21st-century Immortal".
2017: Bai Jinshi–Ding Liren. In this game, Ding Liren created a stunning tactical crush of his young compatriot Bai Jinshi, in just 32 moves with the black pieces, sacrificing his queen and culminating in a spectacular king hunt.
2019: Alireza Firouzja–Murali Karthikeyan. In this game, Karthikeyan sacrificed his queen on move 9 in a known position for a knight and a bishop against prodigious Alireza Firouzja leaving the latter's pieces uncoordinated and without decent squares and eventually went on to win.

2020s
2021: Carlsen versus Nepomniachtchi, World Chess Championship 2021, Game 6. In this game, reigning world champion Magnus Carlsen (as White) exchanged his queen for two rooks to enter into an unbalanced endgame—which was drawn, according to the endgame tablebases, after only seven pieces remained on the board—but challenger Ian Nepomniachtchi (as Black) committed a decisive mistake on move 130 and resigned after Carlsen's 136th move. It was the first decisive classical game in a World Chess Championship in more than five years, ending the longest-ever streak of 19 draws in consecutive World Chess Championship classical games, and the 136-move game became the longest in the history of the World Chess Championship.

See also

 List of chess games between Anand and Kramnik
 List of chess games between Kasparov and Kramnik

References

 
Games
History of chess